The Harshacharita (The deeds of Harsha), is the biography of Indian emperor Harsha by Banabhatta, also known as Bana, who was a Sanskrit writer of seventh-century CE India. He was the Asthana Kavi, meaning Court Poet, of Harsha. The Harshacharita was the first composition of Bana and is considered to be the beginning of writing of historical poetic works in the Sanskrit language.

The Harshacharita ranks as the first historical biography in Sanskrit although it is written in a florid and fanciful style. Bana's detailed and vivid descriptions of rural India's natural environment as well as the extraordinary industry of the Indian people exudes the vitality of life at that time. Since he received the patronage of the emperor Harsha, his descriptions of his patron are not an unbiased appraisal and presents the emperor's actions in an overly favourable light.

Contents 
The Harṣacharita, written in ornate poetic prose, narrates the biography of the emperor Harsha in eight ucchvāsas (chapters). In the first two ucchvāsas, Bana gives an account of his ancestry and his early life. He was the great emperor.

Commentaries 
The only commentary available is the Sanketa written by Shankara, a scholar from Kashmir. It seems that Ruyyaka also wrote a commentary known as the Harsacaritavartika, which has not yet been found.

The work was translated into English by Edward Byles Cowell and Frederick William Thomas in 1897.  The military historian Kaushik Roy describes Harshacharita as "historical fiction" but with a factually correct foundation.

This work was translated into Telugu prose by M. V. Ramanachari (Medepalli Venkata Ramanacharyulu) of Maharajah's College, Vizianagaram in 1929.

See also 

 Ashokavadana
 Prithviraj Raso
 Akbarnama
 Raja Vikramaditya
 Bharat ka veer yoddha Maharaja pratap
 Shahjahannamana

References

Further reading 
 Ashok Kaushik. Harsh Charita by Bann Bhatt (in Hindi), Diamond Pocket Books, Delhi

External links 
 

Indian biographies
Sanskrit literature
7th-century Indian books
Biographies about royalty